The 1988–89 Northern Counties East Football League season was the 7th in the history of Northern Counties East Football League, a football competition in England.

Premier Division

The Premier Division featured 17 clubs which competed in the previous season, no new clubs joined the division this season.

League table

Division One

Division One featured 14 clubs which competed in the previous season, along with two new clubs, promoted from Division Two:
Collingham
Pickering Town

League table

Division Two

Division One featured 12 clubs which competed in the previous season, along with two new clubs:
Brodsworth Miners Welfare, joined from Doncaster Senior League
Dronfield United, relegated from Division One

League table

References

1988–89
8